The Japanese word  refers to the spirit of a kami or the soul of a dead person. It is composed of two characters, the first of which, is simply an honorific. The second,   means "spirit".  The character pair 神霊, also read mitama, is used exclusively to refer to a kami's spirit. Significantly, the term  is a synonym of shintai, the object which in a Shinto shrine houses the enshrined kami.

Early Japanese definitions of the mitama, developed later by many thinkers like Motoori Norinaga, maintain it consists of several "souls", relatively independent one from the other.

According to the theory, each of the souls making up the spirit has a character and a function of its own; they all exist at the same time, complementing each other. In the Nihon Shoki, the deity Ōnamuchi (Ōkuninushi) actually meets his kushi-mitama and saki-mitama in the form of Ōmononushi, but does not even recognize them. The four seem moreover to have a different importance, and different thinkers have described their interaction differently.

Ara-mitama and nigi-mitama

The  is the rough and violent side of a spirit. A kami's first appearance is as an ara-mitama, which must be pacified with appropriate pacification rites and worship so that the nigi-mitama can appear. 

The  is the normal state of the kami, its functional side, while the ara-mitama appears in times of war or natural disasters.  These two souls are usually considered opposites, and Motoori Norinaga believed the other two to be no more than aspects of the nigi-mitama. 

Ara-mitama and Nigi-mitama are in any case independent agents, so much so that they can sometimes be enshrined separately in different locations and different shintai. For example, Sumiyoshi Shrine in Shimonoseki enshrines the ara-mitama of the Sumiyoshi kami, while Sumiyoshi Taisha in Osaka enshrines its nigi-mitama. Ise Shrine has a sub-shrine called Aramatsuri-no-miya enshrining Amaterasu's ara-mitama. Atsuta-jingū has a sessha called Ichi-no-misaki Jinja for her ara-mitama  and a massha called Toosu-no-yashiro for her  nigi-mitama. No separate enshrinement of the mitama of a kami has taken place since the rationalization and systematization of Shinto actuated by the Meiji Restoration.

Saki-mitama
The  - The happy and loving side of a whole, complete spirit (mitama); this is the soul of blessing and prosperity. In a scene of the Nihon Shoki, kami Ōnamuchi is described in conversation with his own saki-mitama and kushi-mitama. Within Shinto also exists the idea that this the soul which brings good harvests and catches. Motoori Norinaga and others however believe this to be no more than a function of the nigi-mitama.

Kushi-mitama
The  is the wise and experienced side of a whole, complete spirit (mitama); the "wondrous soul" which appears together with the saki-mitama, the providing soul, which is the power behind the harvest. It is believed to have mysterious powers, to cause transformations and to be able to cure illnesses.

Mitama Festival

A widely celebrated Shinto festival to the dead in Japan, particularly at the Yasukuni Shrine. Typically in mid-July.

In popular culture

Ara-mitama was contained by Datara, when he gets angry easily and often using Kamuitama to summon storms and severe droughts in Nintendo DS video game, Inuyasha: Secret of the Divine Jewel.

See also
 Reikon
 Obon
 Chinkon

References

Japanese culture
Shinto
Goryō faith